Shati may refer to:
 Sati (castle), a castle near the Adriatic
 Shati, Iran, a village in Khuzestan Province, Iran
Al-Shati Camp, a refugee camp in Gaza